Morgan County Schools is the operating school district within Morgan County, Alabama.

Schools

High schools
Albert P. Brewer High School (Somerville) 
Danville High School  (Danville)
Falkville High School (Falkville) 
Priceville High School (Decatur) 
West Morgan High School (Trinity)

Middle schools
Cotaco School (Somerville) 
Danville Middle School (Danville) 
Eva School (Eva) 
Lacey's Spring School (Lacey's Spring) 
Priceville Jr. High School (Decatur) 
Ryan School (now closed) (Joppa) 
Sparkman School (Hartselle) 
Union Hill School (Union Hill) 
West Morgan Middle School (Trinity)

Elementary schools
Danville-Neel School (Danville) 
Falkville Elementary School (Falkville) 
Priceville Elementary School (Decatur) 
West Morgan Elementary (Decatur)

External links
Morgan County Schools

School districts in Alabama
Education in Morgan County, Alabama